Klaw or KLAW may refer to:

Klaw (surname)
Kawhi Leonard (born 1991), American basketball player nicknamed "the Klaw"
Klaw (Marvel Comics), a fictional villain
Klaw Theatre, a broadway theatre in Manhattan, New York City
KLAW, American radio station
Lawton-Fort Sill Regional Airport's ICAO code

See also
Claw (disambiguation)